Arslanovo (Arıślan) is a rural locality (a selo) and the administrative centre of Arslanovsky Selsoviet, Chishminsky District, Bashkortostan, Russia. The population was 650 as of 2010. There are 13 streets.

Geography 
Arslanovo is located 11 km north of Chishmy (the district's administrative centre) by road. Novaya is the nearest rural locality.

References 

Rural localities in Chishminsky District